Cryptoblepharus novohebridicus is a species of lizard in the family Scincidae. It is endemic to Vanuatu.

References

Cryptoblepharus
Reptiles described in 1928
Taxa named by Robert Mertens